The Centralian bandy-bandy (Vermicella vermiformis) is a species of snake in the family Elapidae.

It is endemic to Australia.

Habitat and distribution 
It is found in the Northern Territory.

References 

vermiformis
Reptiles described in 1996
Snakes of Australia